The term "military apparatus" refers to a policy of appointing officers of the Brazilian Armed Forces during the government of João Goulart (1961-1964), consisting of favoring, in promotions and nominations to important commands, military officers considered reliable. It is considered the work of the head of the President's Military Cabinet, who, however, later denied its existence. The filling of the high commands with loyal officers was supposed to assure the president's mandate and was considered relevant both within the government and the opposition. However, it did not prevent the deposition of Goulart in the 1964 coup d'état, which was joined by members of the "apparatus", some of whom had participated in the preceding conspiracy.

Goulart's military politics
The governing authorities use various strategies to mitigate the risk posed by the military to their power. In Brazil, where the presence of officers willing to overthrow the government was continuous, every president needed to set up his military apparatus to secure his mandate. Thus, appointments and promotions have always had a political character, and the weak  turned to the military to strengthen itself in a divided scenario. The favoritism and punishment followed the criteria of the civil authorities, "in disregard of the institution", which became accentuated during the administration of General Henrique Teixeira Lott in the War Ministry and reached a climax in the Goulart government. Conspiratorial activity was known to be going on in the barracks, although Goulart and his circle did not identify its sources. In addition, he used military support in the political game, as in the anticipation of the plebiscite on parliamentarism and the request for a state of exception.

Between 1961 and 1964, the percentage of officers promoted to the generalate and who had graduated ahead of their classes in military schools decreased. This evidences a patrimonialist strategy of maintaining military loyalty, in which the ruler assumes more personal control over his officers' careers. The attention given to the military apparatus and the appointment of ruling commanders was visible even in early 1963, with the return to Goulart's full presidential powers. In August, Goulart called General Assis Brasil to deal with the apparatus, which was disorganized by the changes in commands and the political situation. Appointed chief of the President's Military Cabinet in September, he participated in a meeting in Goiás to evaluate the balance of military forces. He set up an autonomous system of contact with the commands. The focus of the appointments was Rio de Janeiro, São Paulo, and Porto Alegre.

By the end of March 1964, the important commands appeared to be in the hands of generals loyal to the government. Meanwhile, potential or probable conspirators were in the reserves, like Golbery do Couto e Silva, without command, like , or in non-command positions, like  and Ernesto Geisel, Costa e Silva and Castelo Branco. Most of the generals involved in the 1964 coup had been passed over for promotion, while many of the legalists purged after Goulart's deposition had been privileged during his tenure.

This personnel policy may have been counterproductive. The practices of sending unwanted officers to remote garrisons and passing over their promotions in favor of less qualified but more loyal ones only increased resentment against the government.

José Murilo de Carvalho notes that Goulart nominated unreliable generals for important positions. Even though there was control over the commands with generals, which was pronounced in Guanabara, lower ranking officers could be drawn into the conspiracy; for then-Colonel , "from Lieutenant colonel on down, everyone was with us". In the words of then Lieutenant-Colonel Adyr Fiúza de Castro, "we were undermining at the level of captain, major, and colonel". There is thus the interpretation that effectively the "military apparatus" did not exist, and after the coup its existence was denied by Assis Brasil.

Regional commands

In June 1963, with the ministerial renewal, the three military ministers were substituted. The practice of changing ministers when they disagreed deprived the president of accurate information about feelings in the military, it prevented each minister from consolidating his military scheme and, by leading to a series of changes in command, upset the officers who lost their posts.

Rio de Janeiro, with its concentration of military force, was the primary destination for reliable officers. The Ministry of War was there, with the entire chain of command guaranteed. In March 1964, General  commanded there, below Dantas Ribeiro, a supporter of the president, in the First Army, who was "a friend of the minister, a disciplined soldier". In the Navy, there was Vice Admiral , commander of the Marine Corps. The concentration of the apparatus in Guanabara made it impossible for it to be the starting point for the coup, but it also ended up allowing less reliable officers to take over in other states.

General Kruel took his place. One of his subordinates, General , of the Divisionary Infantry in Caçapava, was also part of the device. In fact, on the eve of the coup both Kruel and Justino had already been involved in the conspiratorial activity.

Third Army, in Porto Alegre, was with Jair Dantas Ribeiro. Later, as Minister of War, he endorsed the nomination of Benjamim Rodrigues Galhardo to the post, against the opinion of the entire National Security Council. For Corseuil, it was a disastrous choice, and the right thing to do would have been to nominate General Ladário Pereira Telles. Still, Galhardo was considered loyal. The conspiracy was present within his own headquarters, although he did not participate.

The "apparatus" at the moment of the coup
Assis Brasil, very optimistic, assured the president that he could act on the strength of the "famous" or "praised" military apparatus. The conspirators expected it to offer considerable resistance, and were surprised to see it quickly crumble, with most of the military joining the coup and even legalists not offering resistance. In retrospect, the military assess that Assis Brasil lacked strong figures and the number of disgruntled officers was very large.

Minister Jair was hospitalized, disbanding the military dome. Kruel and Justino joined the coup with their Armies after noting the "direction of the wind". In the First Army, Âncora sent troops against the rebellion, but by the afternoon of the 1st the device was very disintegrated in his area and he ceased resistance. In the South, General Galhardo joined the conspiracy on the 31st. However, he accepted the nomination of the legalist General Ladário to take his post. The new incumbent ordered military deployments, but soon realized that his situation was fragile, with most of his subordinate divisions going into rebellion. On the 2nd, he received Goulart himself, who refused the offer to carry on the armed confrontation. Ladário began to obey the orders of Costa e Silva, the new Minister of War, and gave up his command.

Notes

References

Sources

Books
 
 
 
 
 
 
 
 
 
 
 

Articles and papers
 
 
 
 
 

1960s in Brazil
Cold War military history of Brazil